Zodarion pseudoelegans is a spider species found in Spain, France and Ibiza.

See also 
 List of Zodariidae species

References

External links 

pseudoelegans
Spiders of Europe
Insects of Ibiza
Spiders described in 1933